The Great Man is a 2014 French drama film co-written and directed by Sarah Leonor. It was screened in the Discovery section at the 2014 Toronto International Film Festival.

Cast 
 Jérémie Renier as Hamilton / Michaël Hernandez
 Surho Sugaipov as Markov / Mourad Massaev 
 Ramzan Idiev as Khadji  
 Daniel Fassi as Gradé Afghanistan 
 Jean-Yves Ruf as Colonel Lacour 
 Sabine Massé as Sabina 
 Miglen Mirtchev as Johnson 
 Paul Massé as Magomed 
 Laura Arsangereeva as Madina 
 Issita Arslanov as Issita 
 Michaël Klein as Directeur d'école  
 Daphné Dumons as Camille  
 Manon Gineste as Maëva 
 Sava Lolov as Dr. Arnold  
 Guillaume Verdier as Sergent-chef Gao

References

External links 
 

2014 films
2010s French-language films
2014 war drama films
French war drama films
French Foreign Legion in popular culture
Films set in Afghanistan
Films set in Paris
Films about immigration
2014 drama films
2010s French films